Efeilomo Michelle Irele born (born 4 September 1990) is a Nigerian actress  and model popularly known as Efe Irele.

Early life and career 
Efe Irele is a native of Edo State but she was born and raised in Lagos State. She has three siblings. Efe Irele attended Corona Primary School, Lagos, and had her secondary education at Queens College, Yaba.

Irele has a BSc in Sociology from Bowen University and a master's degree in Human Resource Management from University of Chester, UK.

She ventured into modeling for artists and starred in Burna Boy's Like to Party video in 2012. She also starred in Adekunle Gold's Sade video. She has gone on the feature in multiple Nollywood movies and series including Real Side Chics, Wrong Kind of War, Ire’s Ire, Zahra, Scandals 

Efe Irele decided to try acting after working as an HR manager for several months. She landed her first role in the 2016 Iroko TV series, Aso Ebi.

Philanthropy and awards 

Efe launched the Efe Irele Autism Foundation in 2018 to cater for autistic children.

Filmography 
Here are some of the movies Efe featured in:

 Mourning Karen (2017)
 The Real Side Chics (2017)
 Zahra (2017)
 Jon Ajai (2017)
 Aso Ebi (2016 – 2017)
 Single Ladies
 Lagos Real Fake Life (2018)
 Stronger Together (2018)
 Blood Letters (2018)
 Wrong Kind of War (2018)
 Diva (2018)
 Scandals (2018)
 Sophia (2018)
 Finding Happiness (2018)
 Blind Voice (2019)
Two Weeks in Lagos (2019)
 Descendants of the Earth (2019)
 Akpe (2019)
 Manifestation (2020)
 Becca’s List (2020)
 Poor-Ish (2020)
 Sweet Melony (2020)
 Separated (2020)
 When the Lemons Come (2020)
 Hey You (film)

See also
 List of Nigerian actors

References

Living people
Nigerian film actresses
1990 births
Nigerian female models
Actresses from Edo State
21st-century Nigerian actresses
Bowen University alumni
Alumni of the University of Chester
Nigerian film award winners